Notre Dame Preparatory School and Marist Academy is a private Catholic K-12 school in Pontiac, Michigan in Metro Detroit. Founded by Marist Fathers and Brothers in 1994. It is a coed, college-preparatory school.

History
Originally the school was the Pontiac Catholic High School, and it was later known as the Oakland Catholic School. It closed at the end of the 1993–1994 school year and immediately reopened as Notre Dame Prep. The Marists supported Notre Dame after its rebranding.

A  campus in an outlying area in Pontiac houses Notre Dame Prep and Marist Academy.

The school opened on August 28, 1994. The first class graduated in 1995. The middle school opened in August 1996 with an initial enrollment of 162. The lower (elementary) school opened in 2003 and was initially in the former St. Benedict School in Waterford Township; this occurred in a time when other Catholic elementary schools in the area closed. The lower school moved to the common Pontiac campus in 2013. The Notre Dame Prep board acquired the school from the archdiocese in July 2014.

Pontiac Catholic High School
Pontiac Catholic High School was a Catholic high school in Pontiac, Michigan, United States. Pontiac Catholic was established in 1967 when St. Michael High School (St. Mikes) and St. Frederick High School merged.

Pontiac Catholic High School changed its name to Oakland Catholic High School in 1988. Oakland Catholic High School became Pontiac Notre Dame Prep in 1994, a high school run by the Marist Fathers and Brothers.

Notable alumni

Notre Dame High School
 Curtis Hertel Jr. (1996) – State Senator, Democrat – Michigan 
 Doug Weight (1989) – Olympic silver medalist and former NHL player for the New York Rangers, Edmonton Oilers, Carolina Hurricanes, Anaheim Ducks, St. Louis Blues, and New York Islanders.
 Mark Cendrowski (1977) - American film and television director, best known as the director of most episodes of The Big Bang Theory
 John Blum (1977) – former NHL player for the Edmonton Oilers, Boston Bruins, Washington Capitals, and Detroit Red Wings
 Dave Debol (1974) – former NHL player for the Hartford Whalers
 David Bonior (1963) – U.S. Congressman, Democrat – Michigan; House Minority Whip

Pontiac Catholic High School
Anne Rexford (1979)– Former University of Detroit Mercy Women's Basketball Head Coach.
Colleen O'Brien (1974) – Judge, Michigan Court of Appeals

References
 Bunting & Lyon, Peter Bunting. Private Independent Schools. J. E. Bunting., 2007.

External links 
 NDPMA Official Website

Notes

Roman Catholic Archdiocese of Detroit
Catholic secondary schools in Michigan
Schools in Pontiac, Michigan
High schools in Oakland County, Michigan
Schools in Oakland County, Michigan
Private K-12 schools in Michigan
1994 establishments in Michigan
Educational institutions established in 1994